Battle Cry of Freedom: The Civil War Era is a Pulitzer Prize–winning work on the American Civil War, published in 1988, by James M. McPherson. It is the sixth volume of the Oxford History of the United States series. An abridged, illustrated version of the book was published in 2003.

Content 
Battle Cry of Freedom covers two decades, the period from the outbreak of the Mexican–American War to the Civil War's ending at Appomattox. Thus, it examined the Civil War era, not just the war, as it combined the social, military and political events of the period within a single narrative framework. Historian Hugh Brogan, reviewing the book, commends McPherson for initially describing "the republic at midcentury" as "a divided society, certainly, and a violent one, but not one in which so appalling a phenomenon as civil war is likely. So it must have seemed to most Americans at the time. Slowly, slowly the remote possibility became horrible actuality; and Mr. McPherson sees to it that it steals up on his readers in the same way."

A central concern of this work is the multiple interpretations of freedom. In an interview, McPherson claimed: "Both sides in the Civil War professed to be fighting for the same 'freedoms' established by the American Revolution and the Constitution their forefathers fought for in the Revolution—individual freedom, democracy, a republican form of government, majority rule, free elections, etc. For Southerners, the Revolution was a war of secession from the tyranny of the British Empire, just as their war was a war of secession from Yankee tyranny. For Northerners, their fight was to sustain the government established by the Constitution with its guaranties of rights and liberties."

Reception 
The book was an immediate commercial and critical success, an unexpected achievement for a 900-page narrative. It spent 16 weeks on The New York Times hardcover bestseller list with an additional 12 weeks on the paperback list. Writing for The New York Times, Brogan described it as "...the best one-volume treatment of its subject I have ever come across. It may actually be the best ever published."

Steven A. Sund, former US Capitol Police Chief was asked during his January 2023 book tour what book he would recommend, he answered “James M. McPherson's "Battle Cry of Freedom: The Civil War Era"

Editions

See also

For Cause and Comrades: Why Men Fought in the Civil War
The Civil War: A Narrative
 Bibliography of Ulysses S. Grant
 Bibliography of the American Civil War

References

External links

Discussion with McPherson on Battle Cry of Freedom, July 10, 2000, C-SPAN
Presentation by McPherson on the illustrated version of Battle Cry of Freedom, November 3, 2003, C-SPAN

1988 non-fiction books
20th-century history books
Pulitzer Prize for History-winning works
History books about the American Civil War
Oxford University Press books